Catherine Pelonero (born November 7, 1967) is a New York Times bestselling true crime author, best known for her 2014 book Kitty Genovese: A True Account of a Public Murder and Its Private Consequences.

Early life  

Catherine Pelonero was born on November 7, 1967 in Alexandria, Virginia, the oldest child of Salvatore J. Pelonero and Trieva (née Peay) Pelonero. Her parents soon after moved to her father's hometown of Buffalo, New York where her father became a police officer. Pelonero grew up in Buffalo and the surrounding Western New York area.  Her nonfiction articles and books often deal with crimes that occurred in Buffalo and New York City.

Career and education 

Pelonero began her career as a playwright, studying with Emanuel Fried and working in local theatre in Buffalo. Her early works were comedies.  She attended Buffalo State College. Her first notable success as a playwright came in 1994 with Family Names, a ten-minute play that premiered in a festival at the Nat Horne Theatre in New York City and went on to win the Off-Off-Broadway Short Play Festival. Family Names was published by Samuel French, Inc. and was subsequently produced at theatres throughout the United States, Canada, and the United Kingdom.  In 2013, Pelonero developed a full-length version of Family Names that received a reading in Hollywood with a cast that included Paul Sorvino, Joseph Bologna, and Renee Taylor.

Pelonero moved to Los Angeles, California in 1995. She continued writing for the theatre and also wrote teleplays and the short screenplay, Preservation Society, which won a screenwriting competition at Yale University and was filmed as a student production under the direction of filmmaker Sandra Luckow.

In 2007, Pelonero became a playwright member of the Actors Studio. Some of her plays were developed in the Studio's west coast Playwrights & Directors Unit. Her absurdist comedy, Another Effing Family Drama, premiered at the Hollywood Fringe Festival in 2011 and was chosen for Best of the Fringe.

True crime 

Pelonero's debut book, Kitty Genovese: A True Account of a Public Murder and Its Private Consequences, was published in 2014. The book is a detailed nonfiction account of the infamous 1964 murder of Catherine “Kitty” Genovese, a young woman stalked and stabbed on the street where she lived in Queens, New York. The book became a best seller, twice making the New York Times Best Sellers List.

Pelonero wrote several subsequent articles about the Kitty Genovese case and her extensive interviews with murderer Winston Moseley.

The success of Kitty Genovese led to offers from various news and television programs for Pelonero as an on-air true crime commentator. At Investigation Discovery's CrimeFeed, she became a contributing writer.

Her second book, Absolute Madness: A True Story of a Serial Killer, Race, and a City Divided, is a nonfiction account of the life and crimes of Joseph Christopher, a white serial killer who targeted black males during a spree across New York in 1980–81. Absolute Madness was published November 7, 2017.  Excerpts from the book appeared in Salon magazine.

Film and television 

Pelonero appears in numerous true crime television programs and films, including A Crime to Remember, Fox Files, Witness, Murderous Affairs, and It Takes a Killer.

Published works 

True crime
•	Kitty Genovese (2014)
•	Absolute Madness (2017)

Plays
•	Family Names (1994, play)
•	Awesome Ghosts of Ontario (2010, play)

References

External links 

Articles by Pelonero on CrimeFeed

People from Alexandria, Virginia
American women dramatists and playwrights
Buffalo State College alumni
1967 births
Living people
Writers from Buffalo, New York
21st-century American women writers
American non-fiction crime writers
20th-century American dramatists and playwrights
21st-century American dramatists and playwrights
American women non-fiction writers
20th-century American non-fiction writers
21st-century American non-fiction writers
20th-century American women writers